Wonder most commonly refers to:
 Wonder (emotion), an emotion comparable to surprise that people feel when perceiving something rare or unexpected

Wonder may also refer to:

Arts and media

Fictional entities 
 The Wonders, a fictional band featured in the 1996 film That Thing You Do!
 Wonder (Zoom), a character in the 2006 American family film Zoom

Film 
 Wonder (film), a 2017 drama based on the R. J. Palacio novel
 The Wonder (film), a 2022 drama based on the Emma Donoghue novel

Literature 
 Wonder (Sawyer novel), the 2011 conclusion of a trilogy by Robert J. Sawyer
 Wonder (Palacio novel), a 2012 novel by R.J. Palacio
 Wonder (comics), a comic debuting 1892
 Wonder, the 2009 English translation of the 1962 novel De verwondering by Hugo Claus
 The Wonder, a novel by Emma Donoghue

Music

Albums 
 Wonder (Lisa Mitchell album), 2009
 Wonder (Michael W. Smith album), 2010
 Wonder (Mamoru Miyano album), 2010
 Wonder (Hillsong United album), 2017
 Wonder (Shawn Mendes album), 2020
 Wonder (Knut album), 2010
 Wonder, a 1991 album by British indie pop band 14 Iced Bears
 Wonder, a 1998 album by American singer-songwriter Katie Reider
 Wonder, a 1998 album by American singer-songwriter Annie Herring
 Wonder, a 2003 album by American singer-songwriter Faith Rivera
 Wonder, a 2013 album by Swedish musician Lustre
 The Wonder (album), a 1990 album by Tom Verlaine

Songs 
 "Wonder" (Embrace song), 2001
 "Wonder" (Natalie Merchant song), 1995
 "Wonder" (Naughty Boy song), 2012
 "Wonder" (Shawn Mendes song), 2020
 "Wonder", by Candy Coded from Moonlight, 2015
 "Wonder", by The Doubleclicks from Dimetrodon, 2014
 "Wonder", by Eden from Vertigo, 2018
 "Wonder", by Hillsong United from Wonder, 2017
 "Wonder", by Lamb Between Darkness and Wonder, 2013
 "Wonder", by Rachel Platten from Wonder Park
 "Wonder", by Soap&Skin from Narrow, 2012
 "The Wonder", by Sonic Youth from Daydream Nation, 1988
 "Wonder", by Alisabeth Von Presley which represented Iowa in the American Song Contest

Other media 
 The Wonder, a comedy play by Susanna Centlivre

People 
 Wonder Mkhonza, Swaziland politician
 Wonder Monds (born 1952), American football player
 Stevie Wonder (born Stevland Hardaway Judkins in 1950), American recording artist
 Pieter Christoffel Wonder (1780–1852), Dutch painter
 Wayne Wonder (born 1972), Jamaican reggae fusion artist

Places
 Wonder, Kentucky, an unincorporated community
 Wonder, Nevada, a ghost town in Nevada
 Wonder, Oregon, an unincorporated community

Other uses 
 Wonder, a company managed by Bernard Tapie
 The Wonder (horse), a French-bred Thoroughbred racehorse and sire
 The Wonder (pub), pub in Enfield, London, England
 Disney Wonder, a cruise ship operated by Disney Cruise Line
 Wonders of the World, various lists to catalogue the world's most spectacular natural wonders and manmade structures
 Wonder Bread, a type of pre-sliced bread, originally made in the United States
 Wonder, a former battery brand of Energizer company

See also 

 Small Wonder (disambiguation)
 Wonders (disambiguation)
 Wunder (disambiguation)